Ropicosybra is a genus of beetles in the family Cerambycidae, containing the following species:

 Ropicosybra albopubens (Pic, 1926)
 Ropicosybra coomani (Pic, 1926)
 Ropicosybra multipunctata (Pic, 1927)
 Ropicosybra schurmanni Breuning, 1983
 Ropicosybra spinipennis (Pic, 1926)

References

Apomecynini